Defiance High School (DHS) is a public high school in Defiance, Ohio, United States. It was established in 1970 and is part of the Defiance City Schools district.

History
In 2021 the school board allowed the school to establish an eSports club.

Ohio High School Athletic Association State Championships 

 Boys Baseball – 1992, 2013, 2015, 2016
 Boys Football – 1997 
 Boys Cross Country – 2013
 Boys Basketball – 2015

Notable alumni 
 Chad Billingsley, MLB player
 Justin Hancock, MLB player
 Scott Taylor, MLB pitcher
 Jon Niese, MLB player

References

External links 
 

High schools in Defiance County, Ohio
Public high schools in Ohio
Educational institutions established in 1970
1970 establishments in Ohio
High School